The CyberKnife System is a radiation therapy device manufactured by Accuray Incorporated. The CyberKnife System is the only radiation delivery system in the world that features a linear accelerator (linac) directly mounted on a robot to deliver high-energy x-rays or photons used in radiation therapy and combines real-time artificial intelligence (AI)-driven target tracking and treatment delivery. The platform is designed to deliver precise stereotactic radiosurgery (SRS) and stereotactic body radiation therapy (SBRT) for the treatment of benign tumors, malignant tumors, neurologic disorders and other medical conditions.

The CyberKnife System combines a robotic arm that can autonomously move a compact linear accelerator with an option of fixed collimators, IrisTM Variable Aperture Collimator and InCiseTM MLC. The CyberKnife System incorporates an image guidance system that creates images from two orthogonal diagnostic X-ray sources/detectors mounted in the room. During treatment, the patient’s X-ray images are compared in real-time with digitally reconstructed radiographs, and the robot’s position is adjusted according to the findings from comparing those images.

Synchrony Technology 

The CyberKnife System uses real-time target tracking with dynamic delivery technology called Synchrony. Using external markers in conjunction with diagnostic x-ray images, Synchrony helps guide the robotic arm to shift the radiation beam in real-time such that the beam always remains aligned with the target. This design is intended to enable the CyberKnife System to deliver high-dose radiation with sub-millimeter precision and accuracy, minimizing damage to surrounding healthy tissue without the need for invasive fixation devices.

History
The system was invented by John R. Adler, a Stanford University professor of neurosurgery and radiation oncology, and Peter and Russell Schonberg of Schonberg Research Corporation. The CyberKnife System was developed to address limitations of a radiosurgery delivery system that required a rigid frame to be bolted to the patients' head, from imaging through to treatment. Wearing this head frame limited the use of the system to single treatments within the brain or base of the skull. The first CyberKnife system was installed at Stanford University in 1991. The device was approved by the FDA for the treatment of intracranial tumors in 1999 and for the treatment of tumors anywhere in the body in 2001. Since the original design, Accuray Incorporated released several CyberKnife System models, with significant features and clinical improvements over the years: the CyberKnife G3 System in 2005, the CyberKnife G4 System in 2007, the CyberKnife VSI System in 2009, the CyberKnife M6 System in 2012, and the CyberKnife S7 System in 2020.

Clinical application
The system is used to treat most types of intracranial tumors with SRS and notably paved the way for the use of SBRT anywhere in the body. SRS is commonly used in the treatment of brain metastases as well as other intracranial indications, with the advantage of delivering high doses to the tumor while minimizing dose to surrounding organs at risk.

SBRT requires precise image-guided delivery and is now commonly used in localized prostate cancer patients, demonstrating encouraging control rates. SBRT is also widely utilized in the treatment of patients with inoperable lung cancer or those that may refuse surgery.The CyberKnife System plays a crucial role in the treatment of local recurrence as it allows very precise re-irradiation in areas close to critical structures. 

Oligometastases represent a limited number of metastatic sites that can benefit from radiation therapy to achieve long-term disease control. These metastatic sites are amenable to direct treatment approaches to control disease effectively. Several studies have shown the benefit of the CyberKnife System and effective oligometastatic SBRT in breast and gynecological cancers.

Clinical Citations

Brain Metastases 

 Borzillo V, Di Franco R, Giannarelli D, Cammarota F, Scipilliti E, D'Ippolito E, Petito A, Serra M, Falivene S, Grimaldi AM, Simeone E, Festino L, Vanella V, Trojaniello C, Vitale MG, Madonna G, Ascierto PA, Muto P. Ipilimumab and Stereotactic Radiosurgery with CyberKnife® System in Melanoma Brain Metastases: A Retrospective Monoinstitutional Experience. Cancers (Basel). 2021 Apr 13;13(8):1857. doi: 10.3390/cancers13081857. PMID: 33924595; PMCID: PMC8068853.
 Martinage G, Geffrelot J, Stefan D, Bogart E, Rault E, Reyns N, Emery E, Makhloufi-Martinage S, Mouttet-Audouard R, Basson L, Mirabel X, Lartigau E, Pasquier D. Efficacy and Tolerance of Post-operative Hypo-Fractionated Stereotactic Radiotherapy in a Large Series of Patients With Brain Metastases. Front Oncol. 2019 Mar 28;9:184. doi: 10.3389/fonc.2019.00184. PMID: 30984617; PMCID: PMC6448411.

Trigeminal Neuralgia 

 Conti A, Acker G, Pontoriero A, Hardt J, Kluge A, Cacciola A, Iatì G, Kufeld M, Budach V, Vajkoczy P, Beltramo G, Pergolizzi S, Bergantin A, Loebel F, Parisi S, Senger C, Romanelli P. Factors affecting outcome in frameless non-isocentric stereotactic radiosurgery for trigeminal neuralgia: a multicentric cohort study. Radiat Oncol. 2020 May 22;15(1):115. doi: 10.1186/s13014-020-01535-1. PMID: 32443978; PMCID: PMC7243318.
 Romanelli P, Conti A, Redaelli I, Martinotti AS, Bergantin A, Bianchi LC, Beltramo G. Cyberknife Radiosurgery for Trigeminal Neuralgia. Cureus. 2019 Oct 28;11(10):e6014. doi: 10.7759/cureus.6014. PMID: 31815078; PMCID: PMC6881081.

Arteriovenous Malformations 

 Kelly R, Conte A, Nair MN, Voyadzis JM, Anaizi A, Collins S, Kalhorn C, Stemer A, Mai J, Armonda R, Lischalk J, Berkowitz F, Nayar V, McGrail K, Collins BT. Arteriovenous Malformations Treated With Frameless Robotic Radiosurgery Using Non-Invasive Angiography: Long-Term Outcomes of a Single Center Pilot Study. Front Oncol. 2020 Nov 30;10:570782. doi: 10.3389/fonc.2020.570782. PMID: 33330045; PMCID: PMC7734323.
 Rashad S, Endo T, Ogawa Y, Sato K, Endo H, Matsumoto Y, Takahashi A, Tominaga T. Stereotactic radiosurgery as a feasible treatment for intramedullary spinal arteriovenous malformations: a single-center observation. Neurosurg Rev. 2017 Apr;40(2):259-266. doi: 10.1007/s10143-016-0758-z. Epub 2016 Jun 6. PMID: 27270299.

Vestibular Schwannoma 

 Windisch PY, Tonn JC, Fürweger C, Wowra B, Kufeld M, Schichor C, Muacevic A. Clinical Results After Single-fraction Radiosurgery for 1,002 Vestibular Schwannomas. Cureus. 2019 Dec 16;11(12):e6390. doi: 10.7759/cureus.6390. PMID: 31938667; PMCID: PMC6957120.
 Puataweepong P, Dhanachai M, Swangsilpa T, Sitathanee C, Ruangkanchanasetr R, Hansasuta A, Pairat K. Long-term clinical outcomes of stereotactic radiosurgery and hypofractionated stereotactic radiotherapy using the CyberKnife® robotic radiosurgery system for vestibular schwannoma. Asia Pac J Clin Oncol. 2022 Oct;18(5):e247-e254. doi: 10.1111/ajco.13592. Epub 2021 Jul 26. PMID: 34310064.

Meningioma 

 Alfredo C, Carolin S, Güliz A, Anne K, Antonio P, Alberto C, Stefano P, Antonino G, Harun B, Markus K, Franziska M, Phuong N, Franziska L, Peter V, Volker B, David K. Normofractionated stereotactic radiotherapy versus CyberKnife-based hypofractionation in skull base meningioma: a German and Italian pooled cohort analysis. Radiat Oncol. 2019 Nov 12;14(1):201. doi: 10.1186/s13014-019-1397-7. Erratum in: Radiat Oncol. 2020 Dec 14;15(1):279. PMID: 31718650; PMCID: PMC6852939.
 Oh HJ, Cho YH, Kim JH, Kim CJ, Kwon DH, Lee D, Yoon K. Hypofractionated stereotactic radiosurgery for large-sized skull base meningiomas. J Neurooncol. 2020 Aug;149(1):87-93. doi: 10.1007/s11060-020-03575-9. Epub 2020 Jul 1. PMID: 32607731.

Spine 

 Ehret F, Senger C, Kufeld M, Fürweger C, Kord M, Haidenberger A, Windisch P, Rueß D, Kaul D, Ruge M, Schichor C, Tonn JC, Muacevic A. Image-Guided Robotic Radiosurgery for the Management of Intramedullary Spinal Cord Metastases-A Multicenter Experience. Cancers (Basel). 2021 Jan 15;13(2):297. doi: 10.3390/cancers13020297. PMID: 33467434; PMCID: PMC7829974.
 Gill B, Oermann E, Ju A, Suy S, Yu X, Rabin J, Kalhorn C, Nair MN, Voyadzis JM, Unger K, Collins SP, Harter KW, Collins BT. Fiducial-free CyberKnife stereotactic body radiation therapy (SBRT) for single vertebral body metastases: acceptable local control and normal tissue tolerance with 5 fraction approach. Front Oncol. 2012 Apr 26;2:39. doi: 10.3389/fonc.2012.00039. PMID: 22645718; PMCID: PMC3355827.

Head and Neck Cancer 

 Yamazaki H, Suzuki G, Aibe N, Yasuda M, Shiomi H, Oh RJ, Yoshida K, Nakamura S, Konishi K, Ogita M. Reirradiation for Nasal Cavity or Paranasal Sinus Tumor-A Multi-Institutional Study. Cancers (Basel). 2021 Dec 16;13(24):6315. doi: 10.3390/cancers13246315. PMID: 34944935; PMCID: PMC8699758.
 Blažek T, Zděblová Čermáková Z, Knybel L, Hurník P, Štembírek J, Resová K, Paračková T, Formánek M, Cvek J, Soumarová R. Dose escalation in advanced floor of the mouth cancer: a pilot study using a combination of IMRT and stereotactic boost. Radiat Oncol. 2021 Jun 29;16(1):122. doi: 10.1186/s13014-021-01842-1. PMID: 34187494; PMCID: PMC8243893.

Lung Cancer 

 Salvestrini V, Duijm M, Loi M, Nuyttens JJ. Survival and Prognostic Factors of Ultra-Central Tumors Treated with Stereotactic Body Radiotherapy. Cancers (Basel). 2022 Nov 29;14(23):5908. doi: 10.3390/cancers14235908. PMID: 36497390; PMCID: PMC9737655.
 Ryuno Y, Abe T, Iino M, Saito S, Aoshika T, Oota T, Igari M, Hirai R, Kumazaki Y, Kaira K, Kagamu H, Ishida H, Noda SE, Kato S. High-dose stereotactic body radiotherapy using CyberKnife® for stage I peripheral lung cancer: a single-center retrospective study. Radiat Oncol. 2022 Jul 19;17(1):128. doi: 10.1186/s13014-022-02094-3. PMID: 35854333; PMCID: PMC9297648.

Liver Cancer 

 Stintzing S, Einem JV, Fueweger C, Haidenberger A, Fedorov M, Muavcevic A. Long-term Survival in Patients Treated with a Robotic Radiosurgical Device for Liver Metastases. Cancer Res Treat. 2019 Jan;51(1):187-193. doi: 10.4143/crt.2017.594. Epub 2018 Apr 16. PMID: 29656632; PMCID: PMC6333969.
 Ji X, Zhao Y, He C, Han S, Zhu X, Shen Z, Chen C, Chu X. Clinical Effects of Stereotactic Body Radiation Therapy Targeting the Primary Tumor of Liver-Only Oligometastatic Pancreatic Cancer. Front Oncol. 2021 May 27;11:659987. doi: 10.3389/fonc.2021.659987. PMID: 34123818; PMCID: PMC8190391.

Pancreatic Cancer 

 Lischalk JW, Burke A, Chew J, Elledge C, Gurka M, Marshall J, Pishvaian M, Collins S, Unger K. Five-Fraction Stereotactic Body Radiation Therapy (SBRT) and Chemotherapy for the Local Management of Metastatic Pancreatic Cancer. J Gastrointest Cancer. 2018 Jun;49(2):116-123. doi: 10.1007/s12029-016-9909-2. PMID: 28044263.
 Shen ZT, Zhou H, Li AM, Ji XQ, Jiang CC, Yuan X, Li B, Zhu XX, Huang GC. Clinical outcomes and prognostic factors of stereotactic body radiation therapy combined with gemcitabine plus capecitabine for locally advanced unresectable pancreatic cancer. J Cancer Res Clin Oncol. 2020 Feb;146(2):417-428. doi: 10.1007/s00432-019-03066-z. Epub 2019 Oct 30. PMID: 31667573.

Gynecological 

 Morgenthaler J, Köhler C, Budach V, Sehouli J, Stromberger C, Besserer A, Trommer M, Baues C, Marnitz S. Long-term results of robotic radiosurgery for non brachytherapy patients with cervical cancer. Strahlenther Onkol. 2021 Jun;197(6):474-486. doi: 10.1007/s00066-020-01685-x. Epub 2020 Sep 24. PMID: 32970164; PMCID: PMC8154829.
 Pontoriero A, Iatì G, Aiello D, Pergolizzi S. Stereotactic Radiotherapy in the Retreatment of Recurrent Cervical Cancers, Assessment of Toxicity, and Treatment Response: Initial Results and Literature Review. Technol Cancer Res Treat. 2016 Dec;15(6):759-765. doi: 10.1177/1533034615608740. Epub 2015 Sep 30. PMID: 26424502.

Prostate Cancer 

 Tree AC, Ostler P, van der Voet H, Chu W, Loblaw A, Ford D, Tolan S, Jain S, Martin A, Staffurth J, Armstrong J, Camilleri P, Kancherla K, Frew J, Chan A, Dayes IS, Duffton A, Brand DH, Henderson D, Morrison K, Brown S, Pugh J, Burnett S, Mahmud M, Hinder V, Naismith O, Hall E, van As N; PACE Trial Investigators. Intensity-modulated radiotherapy versus stereotactic body radiotherapy for prostate cancer (PACE-B): 2-year toxicity results from an open-label, randomised, phase 3, non-inferiority trial. Lancet Oncol. 2022 Oct;23(10):1308-1320. doi: 10.1016/S1470-2045(22)00517-4. Epub 2022 Sep 13. PMID: 36113498.
 Fuller DB, Crabtree T, Kane BL, Medbery CA, Pfeffer R, Gray JR, Peddada A, Royce TJ, Chen RC. High Dose "HDR-Like" Prostate SBRT: PSA 10-Year Results From a Mature, Multi-Institutional Clinical Trial. Front Oncol. 2022 Jul 29;12:935310. doi: 10.3389/fonc.2022.935310. PMID: 35965547; PMCID: PMC9373838.

See also

Image-guided radiation therapy
Horsley–Clarke apparatus
TomoTherapy
Robotic surgery

References

External links 
 Accuray Inc.

Further reading 
 
 Principles and Practice of Stereotactic Radiosurgery, Lawrence Chin, MD and William Regine, MD, Editors (2008)

Radiation therapy procedures
Neurosurgery
Surgical robots
Robots of the United States
1990 robots